James Leonard (5 June 1927 – 13 April 2022) was an Irish Fianna Fáil politician. Leonard was first elected to Dáil Éireann as a Fianna Fáil Teachta Dála (TD) for the Monaghan constituency at the 1973 general election. He was re-elected for the Cavan–Monaghan constituency at the 1977 general election. He lost his seat at the 1981 general election but was elected to Seanad Éireann by the Administrative Panel. He regained his Dáil seat at the February 1982 general election and retained it until retiring at the 1997 general election.

After his retirement, his daughter Ann Leonard unsuccessfully stood for his seat as a Fianna Fáil candidate at the 1997 general election. She was then nominated by the Taoiseach to the Seanad.

See also
Families in the Oireachtas

References

1927 births
2022 deaths
Fianna Fáil TDs
Members of the 20th Dáil
Members of the 21st Dáil
Members of the 15th Seanad
Members of the 23rd Dáil
Members of the 24th Dáil
Members of the 25th Dáil
Members of the 26th Dáil
Members of the 27th Dáil
Irish farmers
Politicians from County Monaghan
Local councillors in County Monaghan
Fianna Fáil senators